The 1966–67 NBA season was the Lakers' 19th season in the NBA and seventh season in Los Angeles. This was the final season that they wore blue and white uniforms with cursive script reading "Los Angeles" on the front of both home and away uniforms, which had been in place since the team moved to Los Angeles in 1960, the following year they would switch to their familiar purple and gold with "Lakers" on the front of both uniforms, where it has remained ever since.

This season is also the final full season the Lakers played at the Sports Arena; they would move to The Forum in late 1967.

Roster

Regular season

Season standings

x – clinched playoff spot

Record vs. opponents

Game log

Playoffs

|- align="center" bgcolor="#ffcccc"
| 1
| March 21
| @ San Francisco
| L 108–124
| Archie Clark (26)
| Elgin Baylor (12)
| Clark, Imhoff (4)
| Oakland–Alameda County Coliseum Arena11,106
| 0–1
|- align="center" bgcolor="#ffcccc"
| 2
| March 23
| San Francisco
| L 102–113
| Archie Clark (24)
| Darrall Imhoff (10)
| three players tied (5)
| Los Angeles Memorial Sports Arena11,335
| 0–2
|- align="center" bgcolor="#ffcccc"
| 3
| March 26
| @ San Francisco
| L 115–122
| Elgin Baylor (37)
| Elgin Baylor (18)
| Walt Hazzard (8)
| Cow Palace5,845
| 0–3
|-

Awards and records
 Elgin Baylor, All-NBA First Team
 Jerry West, All-NBA First Team
 Elgin Baylor, NBA All-Star Game
 Jerry West, NBA All-Star Game
 Darrall Imhoff, NBA All-Star Game

References

Los Angeles Lakers seasons
Los Angeles Lakers
Los Angle
Los Angle